The Sarasaviya Best Female Playback Singer Award is presented annually by the weekly Sarasaviya newspaper in collaboration with the Associated Newspapers of Ceylon Limited at the Sarasaviya Awards Festival.
Although the Sarasaviya Awards Ceremony began in 1964, this award was introduced much later. Out of the award-winning singers, Nanda Malini has won the most, 11 Sarasaviya Awards. Following is a list of the winners of this prestigious title since then.

References

Female Playback